Anna Larsson Seim (born 1974), is an Associate Professor in Economics and the Deputy Head of the Department of Economics at Stockholm University.

Seim obtained her PhD at the Institute for International Economic Studies (IIES) at Stockholm University in 2007 with the dissertation Real Effects of Monetary Regimes. Apart from monetary policy, her research focuses on wage setting and fiscal policy as well as the relation between institutions and long-term growth.

Seim also has a number of appointments outside of academia. She is a member in the scientific council of the Swedish National Debt Office as well as a member of the board of The Expert Group on Public Economics (ESO) at the Swedish Ministry of Finance. In 2018 she was one of the two discussants when the Committee on Finance in the Swedish parliament held a hearing on that year's monetary policy.

Seim often comments on macroeconomic issues in national Swedish media, such as Svenska Dagbladet, Expressen and Dagens industri. She is also an associate editor for The Scandinavian Journal of Economics.

References

1974 births
Living people
Academic staff of Stockholm University
Stockholm University alumni